The Rai dynasty (c. 489–632 CE) was a polity of ancient Sindh.

Scholarship 

Pre-Islamic Sindh has been the subject of voluminous scholarship concerning the eve of Arab conquests; under the British Raj, as bureaucrats and amateur historians mined the Chachnama to justify their invasion of Khairpur citing the tyranny of the Muslim rulers, the Rai dynasty received some attention. In modern scholarship, the dynasty has attracted sparse attention from a few numismatists.

Background 

Coinage attests to the indirect influence of Sasanians over Sindh since the reign of Shapur II. In the last Sassanian mints discovered from the region—of Peroz I (r. 459–484)—a new Brahmi legend "Ranaditya Satya" appears on the reverse, which was probably the name of the local ruler. Sometime soon, Sindh appears to have fallen off the orbit of Sassanians who were reeling under Hephthalite invasions. The Rai dynasty's origin probably laid in this power vacuum.

Sources 
Sindh, as a region, had no extant histories until late-medieval era and our knowledge of Rai dynasty remains rudimentary.

No definitive epigraphic or archaeological evidence, pertaining to the dynasty, can be located. The lone literary source remains Chachnama. Though the historical accuracy of Chachnama remains disputed among scholars, its narrative has made to multiple Persian and Oriental histories of the region including Tarikh i Sind (17th c.), Tuhfatul karaam (18th c.), and British Gazettes.

Rulers 
The Rais reigned for a period of 144 years c. 489 – 632 A.D. They allegedly had familial ties with other rulers of South Asia including Kashmir, Kabul, Rajasthan, Gujarat etc. However, their origins remain unknown.

Rai Diwaji, Rai Sahiras I, and Rai Sahasi I 
Nothing is known about the first three kings; their names are mentioned in a single line in the Chachnama, where Wazir Buddhiman describes the territorial expanses and administrative structure of Rais under Rai Sahiras II to Chach.

Rai Sahiras II 
The Chachnama in its opening verses note Rai Sahiras II to be famed for his justice and generosity; his coffers overflowed with wealth. The kingdom was divided into four units, each under a governor or a vassal. The southern unit extended from the coasts of Arabian Sea to Lohana and Samona—including Nerun and Debal port—and had its capital at Brahmanabad. The central unit spanned across the areas around Jankan and Rujaban to the Makran frontier; it had Sewistan as its capital. The western unit extended over a vast area—Batia, Chachpur and Dehrpur—of western Sindh; Iskalanda was the capital. The northern unit was centered around Multan, adjoining Kashmir.

Sahiras II met his death while attempting to ward off an invasion by the Sassanian King of Nimroz into Kirman. He was portrayed as a valiant king who battled till death despite much of his forces deserting the battle; Makran and other unknown territories were lost in the conflict.

Rai Sahasi II 
Under his regime, the kingdom exhibited socioeconomic prosperity; Sahasi II is praised as a benevolent ruler who chose to abide by his counsel. He was married to Sohman Devi. 

During his regime, Chach, a poor learned Brahmin was inducted under minister/chamberlain Ram in the epistolary office. He impressed Sahasi II with his expertise and rose through the ranks quickly, eventually becoming his personal secretary after Ram's death. As Chach gained access to the interiors of palace, Devi became enamored of him and proposed for marriage but met with Chach's rejection; Chachnama explains that he did not wish to incur the King's wrath and swerve further away from the scriptural ideals of a Brahminic life. Yet, Chach accepted her request for providing company and their relationship blossomed. Sahasi II, ignorant of Chach's ways, continued to let him gain unprecedented control in the affairs of the state until his natural death.

Usurpation 
On Sahasi II's death, Devi proposed that Chach usurp the throne. He conceded to Devi's plan, albeit unwillingly, and the news of Sahasi II's death was withheld from public; in the meanwhile, the familial claimants to the throne were incited against each other in a fatal internecine warfare. Then Devi proclaimed that Sahasi II, though recovering, was unable to hold court and had appointed Chach as the caretaker ruler for his lifetime. The elites were lured into supporting the coverup and Chach ruled as the de facto King for about six months. 

However, the news of the King's death somehow made way to Sahasi II's brother—Rai Mahrit, then ruler of Chittor—who claimed the throne and mounted a military offensive against Chach. Chachnama notes Chach to have been ambiguous about the morality of taking on a legitimate successor before being coaxed by Devi, who had shamed his masculinity. Having secured a freak victory, he commissioned triumphal arches and held public feasts winning over the masses; soon, Devi had him declared as the heir to the throne, being a man of unsurmountable intellect and bravery, and would marry him with the approval of the court. 

Thus the Brahman dynasty was established, in what is portrayed in Chachnama, as the intrigues of a femme fatale working in conjunction with a willing-yet-ethical apprentice. Chach would later have to subdue protracted resistance from Bachhera, a relative of Sahasi II and the governor (or vassal) of Multan province.

External links

|-

|-

Notes

References

History of Sindh
History of Balochistan
Dynasties of Pakistan
History of Pakistan
Medieval India
Dynasties of India
Chach Nama
History of Gujarat
Rajput clans of Sindh